The 2016–17 EFL League One (referred to as the Sky Bet League One for sponsorship reasons) was the 13th season of the Football League One under its current title and the 24th season under its current league division format. The fixtures were announced on 22 June 2016.

Team changes 
Bolton and Oxford competed in the third tier for the first time under the League One name. AFC Wimbledon made their debut in the third tier.

To League One
Promoted from League Two
 Northampton Town
 Oxford United
 Bristol Rovers
 AFC Wimbledon
Relegated from Championship
 Charlton Athletic
 Milton Keynes Dons
 Bolton Wanderers

From League One
Promoted to Championship
 Wigan Athletic 
 Burton Albion 
 Barnsley
Relegated to League Two
 Doncaster Rovers
 Blackpool 
 Colchester United
 Crewe Alexandra

Teams

Managerial changes

League table

Play-offs

Results

Top scorers

Monthly awards

Attendances
Teams with an average home attendance of at least 10,000 in 2016–17 EFL League One season:

References

 
EFL League One seasons
3
Eng

2